The Silvestercyclocross or Ereprijs Paul Herygers is a cyclo-cross held yearly in Belgium. From 1993 to 2004 the race was organized in Veldegem, from 2005 to 2008 in Torhout and since 2009 in Bredene. It is part of the Ethias Cross series.
Until 2020 the race was held at the end of December, but in 2021 it moved to the end of September.

Winners

Men

Women

External links & references
 Official website
 Brico Cross Bredene - Honours List

Cycle races in Belgium
Cyclo-cross races